King's Lynn Stars are a motorcycle speedway team who compete in the SGB Premiership. The nickname "Stars" comes from the defunct Norwich Stars team. The team was founded in 1965 and has been running continually since then, except for 1996 when King's Lynn failed to have a team competing in the British league system.

History

1966–1995

The team's inaugural season was the 1966 British League season, where they finished 16th. They managed to finish in third place during the 1972 and 1973 seasons with their strongest riders being Terry Betts and Malcolm Simmons.

The first silverware won by the team was the Knockout Cup in 1977. They won the final by the small margin of two points on aggregate, thanks largely to Michael Lee and Betts. The team continued to compete in the highest division until the end of the 1995 season but failed to finish any higher than 4th place.

The team has operated with a few different nicknames, including: the Knights; Silver Machine (as an additional nickname to the Knights) and the Stars. The team colours were originally green and yellow, taken directly from the Norwich Stars but in 1994 the green was replaced with blue, to match the blue and yellow of the King's Lynn official town crest. During their time as the Knights, silver and black became the prominent colours, but since reviving the Stars nickname they returned to using blue and yellow.

1997–2004
In 1997, the team returned to league action following one year out, they joined the Elite League and were known as the King's Lynn Knights. During the 2000 Elite League speedway season the team finished runner-up behind Eastbourne Eagles and won the Knockout Cup for the second time. The Australian pairing of Leigh Adams and Jason Crump topped the league averages. A junior side were introduced in 1998 and competed under various names in the following seasons, including the Starlets, Braves, Kids and Young Stars.

In 2002, the club became the Silver Machine for one season before reverting back to their traditional name of the Stars and joining the second division. After two more seasons in the Premier League they entered the 2005 season which was the start of some very successful years.

2005–2010
After winning the Knockout Cup in 2005 the finished top of the Premier League table in 2006 but were the first such team not automatically crowned champions because it was the first season that the Premier League used the play-off system to decide the championship. However, the Stars beat the Sheffield Tigers in the play off final to be crowned champions. King's Lynn Stars also won the 2006 Premier Trophy and the 2006 Premier League Knockout Cup completing the treble for the year. In 2007 the Stars once again won the  Premier Trophy and  Premier League Knock-out Cup. They also finished top of the Premier League table but that year the Stars were beaten by the Sheffield Tigers in the play-off semi-final. Rye House were ultimately crowned Premier League champions. In 2008 the Stars were eliminated from the Premier Trophy and the Premier League Knockout Cup, but eventually finished third in the league. They then participated in the play-off promotion battle, where they lost on aggregate to Edinburgh in the final. In 2009, for the second time in three years, the Stars won the treble: the first club ever to achieve this feat twice. The Stars were crowned league champions on 16 September 2009 but then lost on aggregate to the Edinburgh Monarchs in the promotion play-off final. The Stars also won the Premier Trophy on 30 September beating the Edinburgh Monarchs 99–92 on aggregate over two legs and in October the Stars won the Knock-Out Cup, beating the same Edinburgh Monarchs again on aggregate over two legs. In total from 2005 to 2009 they won four knockout cups and two league titles.

2011–present
The 2011 season saw King's Lynn move up to the Elite League, marking a return to the top flight of speedway for the Stars. Only Kozza Smith, Olly Allen and Tomas Topinka were kept on the squad, with the rest of the team brought in from other Elite squads. The Stars proved very competitive home and away and finished third in the League and qualified for the playoffs, where they lost to the Poole Pirates in the semi-finals. They continued to compete in the Elite League and finished 2nd in 2014.

During the SGB Premiership 2018 the club just failed to win the highest league title, to have won it would have been the first time in the club's history. They topped the regular season table but lost in the play off final to Poole Pirates.

Season summary (1st team)

Season summary (Junior team)

Riders previous seasons

1976 team
Adi Funk
David Gagen
Jan Henningsen
Michael Lee
Terry Betts
Ray Bales

2011 team

2012 team
For the 2012 season, the Bjerre brothers returned to their parent club, Peterborough Panthers and the Stars and declined to renew with Olly Allen, who also joined the Panthers. The Stars picked up the highly rated young German, Kevin Woelbert who had shown great form when riding at Lynn with Edinburgh in the Premier League. Also the season sees the return of former Premier League favourite Daniel Nermark. To round out the starting 7 the Stars signed David Howe to double up and Polish flyer Maciej Janowski.

2013 team

2014 team

2015 team

2016 team

2017 team

2018 team

2019 team

2021 team

2022 team

 (C)

 (Rising Star)
 (Number 8)

Other team honours
Inter League Knock-out Cup Winners – 1978, 1980

Individual honours
Howard Cole became the first King's Lynn rider to reach a World Final in 1969.
Ian Turner won the British Junior Championship in 1971.
Terry Betts representing England along with Ray Wilson (Leicester Lions), won the 1972 World Pairs Final. 
Terry Betts was a member of the Great Britain team that won the World Team Cup in 1972 and 1973.
Malcolm Simmons was a member of the Great Britain team that won the World Team Cup in 1972 and 1974.
Michael Lee was a member of the England team that won the World Team Cup in 1977 & 1980.
Michael Lee rode for King's Lynn when he won the 1980 Speedway World Championship in Gothenburg, Sweden. 
Dave Jessup representing England along with Peter Collins (Belle Vue Aces), won the 1980 World Pairs Final.
Dave Jessup was a member of the England team that won the World Team Cup in 1974, 1977 and 1980.
Michael Lee won the 1981 World Longtrack Championship Final in Radgona, Yugoslavia.
Tony Rickardsson rode for King's Lynn when he won the 1999 World Championship.
Shane Parker won the South Australian Championship in 2001 and 2002.
Darcy Ward won the World Under 21 Championship in 2009.

References

External links
Adrian Flux Arena

Speedway Elite League teams
Sport in Norfolk
King's Lynn
1965 establishments in England
Sports clubs established in 1965